Preparedness refers to actions that are taken as precautionary measures in the face of potential disasters

Preparedness may also refer to:

 Emergency preparedness, a phase of emergency management
 Preparedness (learning), a concept to explain why certain things are easier to learn than others

See also

 
 Prep (disambiguation)
 Prepare (disambiguation)
 Preparation (disambiguation)
 Preparedness Act (disambiguation)
 Preparedness department (disambiguation)
 Preparedness 101: Zombie Apocalypse, a U.S. CDC blog post
 Preparedness Movement (U.S. politics) of Leonard Wood and Theodore Roosevelt to ready the U.S. military
 Preparedness Day (22 July)
 Preparedness Day Bombing (22 July 1916) in San Francisco
 National preparedness level (U.S.) for wildfires
 National Preparedness Month of the United States